Physornis is an extinct genus of giant flightless predatory birds of the family Phorusrhacidae or "terror birds", most closely related to Paraphysornis, that lived in Argentina. The type species is P. fortis. It lived during the Middle to Late Oligocene (Deseadan). Few fossils are known, but the available material suggests that Physornis was one of the largest phorusrhacids.

History and taxonomy 
The holotype of Physornis (BMNH-A583) is a 137 mm long portion of a symphysis and the right branch of this lower jaw, described in 1894 by paleontologist Florentino Ameghino. He published the name, together with a description but without a drawing, in the same year. The fossil was collected from the Oligocene layers of Santa Cruz Province, Argentina and the Deseadan era SALMA, making it one of the older known phorusrhacid species. The type specimen of Physornis fortis is very fragmetary and besides the type symphysis has virtually no other characteristics, and this has caused the validity of the species to come into question. Ornithologist and paleontologist Bryan Patterson suggested that the type specimen could be from the pelvis of a mammal, claiming that it is a nomen dubium. However in 2003 during their review of phorusrhacidae, Herculano Alvarenga and Elizabeth Höfling found the type symphysis to be diagnostic and from a large phorusrhacid similar to Paraphysornis and Brontornis, though the latter has since been suggested to be a galliform.

Florentino Ameghino named another genus and species of phorusrhacid in 1898, Aucornis eurhynchus, based on a partial mandibular symphysis, proximal tarsometatarsus, and 3 pedal phalanges recovered from the "cretaceo de Patagonia", though these fossils most likely date to the Oligocene instead. This species has been synonymized with Physornis fortis based on the anatomy of the symphysis. Another species, Aucornis solidus, was named the next year by Ameghino based on a proximal portion of a phalanx from the third toe found in the same area. Brodkorb synonymized it with Physornis fortis in 1967, but it could also be synonymous with Andrewsornis abbotti, making it a species inquirenda.

In 1982, Herculano Alvarenga named a new species of Physornis, Physornis brasiliensis, based on a 75% complete skeleton from the Upper Oligocene - Lower Miocene layers of São Paulo, Brazil. A decade later in 1993, Alvarenga came to the conclusion that it was actually its own genus of Phorusrhacid that he named Paraphysornis.

Description 
Physornis has been referred to the Brontornithinae subfamily, the largest and most solidest shock birds, though Brontornis itself is likely not a Phorusrhacid. Physornis probably had a huge size, possibly even approaching to that of Brontornis. The Symphysis Mandibulae is remarkably short and wide and has a characteristic ventral surface in the middle section. The lateral edge of the Hypotarsus is, seen from behind, an excellent comb that clearly distinguishes the genus Paraphysornis and Brontornis. The lateral cotyle of the tarsometatarsus is almost square when it is seen from close by.

Classification 
Ameghino originally classified Physornis with his taxa Phorusrhacos and Tolmodus, though in years since it has also been classified closest to Brontornis and Paraphysornis, the former possibly being a type of gastornithid or Anseriform instead.The following phylogenetic tree shows the internal relationships of Phorusrhacidae under the exclusion of Brontornis as published by Degrange and colleagues in 2015, which recovers Physornis as a member of a large clade that includes Patagornis, Phorusrhacos and Andalgalornis, among others.

References 

Brontornithinae
Deseadan
Fossils of Argentina
Fossil taxa described in 1895
Taxa named by Florentino Ameghino
Phorusrhacidae
Oligocene birds
Golfo San Jorge Basin
Sarmiento Formation
Paleogene Argentina